Szymon Wydra (born March 11, 1976, in Radom) is a Polish rock vocalist, poet and finalist on the first edition of Polish Idol. He is also a vocalist of Carpe Diem.

Career
Wydra's first music band, Nadzieja (Hope), existed for two years and played punk rock. He has been vocalist and leader of his own band, Szymon Wydra & Carpe Diem, since 1992. He took part in a popular Polish TV show Szansa na sukces (Chance for success) in 2001 and achieved respect but was not the winner. He performed again in the same show in February of the following year, singing a song by Ryszard Rynkowski and being chosen by him as the winning participant. On December 13, 2002, his band released their first album, entitled Teraz wiem (Now I know). Their second album, Bezczas was released in 2005.

In August 2007, Wydra was placed among five performers in the semi-final of Polish qualifications for the Sopot Festival. Then he performed with his band the song Gdzie jesteś dziś (Where are you today?) but the jury decided that Poland would be represented by another band, Feel with their song A gdy jest już ciemno.

He strongly criticized illegal downloading of his work from the Internet in one of his most recent interview, going so far as to claim once that it was worse than murder.

Discography

Studio albums

References

1976 births
Living people
People from Radom
Polish pop singers
Polish rock singers
20th-century Polish male singers
21st-century Polish male singers
21st-century Polish singers